Idnea speculans is a species of snout moth in the genus Idnea. It was described by Gottlieb August Wilhelm Herrich-Schäffer in 1858, and is known from Brazil.

References

Moths described in 1858
Chrysauginae